Thirubuvanai is a legislative assembly constituency in the Union territory of Puducherry in India. Thirubuvanai assembly constituency is a part of the Puducherry Lok Sabha constituency. This assembly constituency is reserved for SC candidates.

Member of Legislative Assembly

ELection Result

2021 By-election

References 

Assembly constituencies of Puducherry